Tallano gold refers to a set of interrelated conspiracy theories and internet scams which claim that before Spain colonized the Philippines, the archipelago and surrounding territories were ruled by a certain Tagean Tallano family, that the family owned a vast amount of gold, and that former president Ferdinand Marcos obtained his family's unexplained wealth by receiving some of the Tallano gold as payment for the legal services he allegedly provided to the Tallano family. Offshoots of the conspiracy theories include tales that the country's national hero José Rizal survived his execution, that the gold reserves were used to fund the Vatican, or that the gold was instrumental in starting the World Bank.

A related conspiracy theory is that the Tallano clan has provided 400,000 tons of gold as commission to former President Ferdinand Marcos who became the "sole owner" of such. The gold bars supposedly fell under the custody of the Bangko Sentral ng Pilipinas (BSP), the country's central bank. 

During the 2022 Philippine presidential election, the myth of the Tallano gold was circulated by social media pages supporting Bongbong Marcos, son of Ferdinand. In his presidential campaign, the younger Marcos shrugged off such claims, remarking in a March 15, 2022 interview with One News, that he has not seen a single gold bar in "his entire life." The BSP also released a statement that it has no record of it keeping such Tallano gold bars.

See also 
 Yamashita's gold

References 

Conspiracy theories in the Philippines
Hoaxes in the Philippines